Rangpara is a village in Kalna I CD block in Kalna subdivision of Purba Bardhaman district in the state of West Bengal, India.

Geography

CD block HQ
The headquarters of Kalna I CD block are located at Rangpara.

Urbanisation
87.00% of the population of Kalna subdivision live in the rural areas. Only 13.00% of the population live in the urban areas. The map alongside presents some of the notable locations in the subdivision. All places marked in the map are linked in the larger full screen map.

Demographics
As per the 2011 Census of India Rangpara had a total population of 3,435, of which 1,747 (51%) were males and 1,688 (49%) were females. Population below 6 years was 272. The total number of literates in Rangpara was 2,644 (83.59% of the population over 6 years).

Transport
The State Highway 6 (West Bengal), running from Rajnagar (in Birbhum district) to Alampur (in Howrah district), passes through Rangpara.

References

Villages in Purba Bardhaman district